is an athletic stadium in Fujieda, Shizuoka, Japan.

It hosted the 1952 Emperor's Cup and final game between All Keio and Osaka Club was played there on May 6, 1952.

External links

Football venues in Japan
Sports venues in Shizuoka Prefecture
Fujieda, Shizuoka